Naked Angels is an American theater company founded in 1986 and based in New York City. It was named after John Tytell's book about the Beat Generation, Naked Angels. It has produced plays on controversial social topics such as the critically acclaimed Broadway transfer Next Fall, and featured many Hollywood stars.

Naked Angels originated in a former picture-frame factory on West 17th Street in Manhattan. It "soon became the 'it' place for a generation of about-to-be famous young actors and playwrights."

One of the company's longtime efforts is "The Issues Project", featuring plays or groups of plays focusing on socially relevant issues, often in collaboration with organizations like Amnesty International, The Center for American Progress, Project A.L.S. and The Culture Project. Also known are the group's long-running "Tuesdays@9" cold reading series, where new playwrights, novelists, short-story writers, and actors get together to review work that is still being written.

In 2005, the company partnered with Fox Broadcasting Company to produce Naked TV, an annual showcase of short plays by emerging playwrights. Based on these stagings, Fox executives chose to turn some of the one-act plays into pilot scripts for the primetime network.

Known for "glamorous parties" and "provocative productions", after the first decade the group seemed to have lost the focus on theater. In 1995 the venue on 17th Street (often called "The Place") was closed. By that time many of the early members had gone on to fame in Hollywood or on Broadway.

Participants
The theater company has a long list of co-founders and participants in its many productions over the years.

People identified as co-founders include:
playwright:
Nicole Burdette

Actors and directors:
 Jon Robin Baitz
 Ned Eisenberg
director Jenifer Estess (Producing Director until 1993)
director Pippin Parker (former Artistic Director)
actor and singer Toby Parker
actress Gina Gershon
actor Rob Morrow
actress Mary Stuart Masterson
actress Helen Slater
actor and producer Fisher Stevens
actress Marisa Tomei
actress Nancy Travis
actor Gareth Williams
actor Jeff Williams
actor Bruce MacVittie

People associated with the company:
actor Matthew Broderick and his wife actress Sarah Jessica Parker began dating at Naked Angels where Sarah's brothers Toby and Pippin were co-founders 
actor Chris Stack
playwright Frank Pugliese
playwright Kenneth Lonergan
actor Joe Mantello

References

A Downtown Firmament April 19, 1993, Newsweek, By Marc Peyser

External links
Naked Angels Theater Company official website
more on Naked Angels Tuesdays @ 9
Naked Angels records, 1987-2013, held by the Billy Rose Theatre Division, New York Public Library for the Performing Arts
Arts organizations established in 1986
1986 establishments in New York City
Theatre Ensemble in New York City